Franco Razzotti  (born 6 February 1985) is an Argentine footballer who plays as a midfielder for Gualaceo SC.

Club career

Razzotti plays as a defensive midfielder. However, he started playing in Vélez' first team as a centre back under Ricardo La Volpe's coaching. After a brief loan in Peruvian Sporting Cristal, he returned to Vélez in 2009.

Under Ricardo Gareca's management, Razzotti established as a regular as the team's defensive midfielder, replacing injured Leandro Somoza. Razzotti played all 19 games in Vélez' 2009 Clausura championship winning season. The midfielder further played 11 games in his team's 2011 Clausura winning season, plus another 8 in the Copa Libertadores' semi-finalist campaign.

Razzotti then suffered an injury that left him out of the fields for one year and a half. He returned to the first team in the 2013 Final, playing 14 games. He also started in the team's 2012–13 Superfinal victory against Newell's Old Boys, earning his fourth league title with Vélez.

In 2014, Razzotti was loaned to Independiente, recently relegated to the Primera B Nacional. After losing his place in the starting eleven, he joined FC Vaslui in the Liga I.

International career
Razzotti made his international debut for the Argentina national team on 26 January 2010 as a second-half substitute in a 3–2 win in a friendly match against Costa Rica. He was also an unused substitute in a friendly 4–1 victory over Venezuela on March 16, 2011.

Honours
Vélez Sársfield
Argentine Primera División (4): 2009 Clausura, 2011 Clausura, 2012 Inicial, 2012–13 Superfinal

References

External links
 Argentine Primera statistics at FutbolXXI.com 
  
 

1985 births
Living people
Argentine footballers
Argentina international footballers
Argentine expatriate footballers
Footballers from Buenos Aires
Association football midfielders
Sporting Cristal footballers
Club Atlético Vélez Sarsfield footballers
FC Vaslui players
Argentine Primera División players
Liga I players
Expatriate footballers in Peru
Expatriate footballers in Romania
Argentine expatriate sportspeople in Peru
Argentine expatriate sportspeople in Romania
Argentine people of Italian descent